Gornja Briga (in older sources also Gorenja Briga) is a small settlement in the Municipality of Kočevje in southern Slovenia. The area is part of the traditional region of Lower Carniola and is now included in the Southeast Slovenia Statistical Region.

References

External links
Gornja Briga on Geopedia
Pre–World War II map of Gornja Briga with oeconyms and family names

Populated places in the Municipality of Kočevje